Paul Sverchek (born May 9, 1961) is a former American football defensive tackle. He played for the Minnesota Vikings in 1984.

Early life 
After graduating from San Luis Obispo High School, Sverchek became a three-year starter for Cal Poly. He recorded eight sacks and 47 tackles in 1981, prior to adding 38 tackles along with four sacks in 1982, and then 3.5 more sacks in 1983.

Professional football 
Sverchek was drafted in the eighth round by Minnesota in 1984.

References

1961 births
Living people
People from San Luis Obispo, California
Players of American football from California
American football defensive tackles
Cal Poly Mustangs football players
Minnesota Vikings players